London by Night is an LP album by Julie London, released by Liberty Records under catalog numbers LRP-3105 in monaural and LST-7105 in stereophonic form in 1958. The accompaniment was by Pete King and His Orchestra.

The album was reissued, combined with the 1958 Julie London album About the Blues, in compact disc form in 2001 by EMI.

Track listing

Selected personnel
Julie London – vocals
Howard Roberts - guitar
Al Viola - guitar
Red Callender - double bass
Felix Slatkin - violin
Eleanor Slatkin - cello
Pete King – arranger

References

Liberty Records albums
1958 albums
Julie London albums
Albums produced by Bobby Troup
EMI Records albums